The 2006 IIHF World Championship Division I was an international Ice hockey tournament run by the International Ice Hockey Federation. The tournament was contested from April 23 to April 30, 2009. Participants in this tournament were separated into two separate tournament groups. The Group A tournament was contested in Amiens, France. Group B's games were played in Tallinn, Estonia. Germany and Austria finished atop of Group A and Group B respectively, gaining promotion to the 2007 World Championship. While Israel finished last in Group A and Croatia last in Group B and were relegated to Division II for 2007.

Participants

Group A

Group B

Group A tournament

Fixtures
All times local.

Ranking and statistics

GP = Games played; G = Goals; T = Ties; L = Losses; GF = Goals for; GA = Goals against; GDF = Goal difference; PTS = PointsSource: IIHF.com

Scoring leaders
List shows the top skaters sorted by points, then goals. If the list exceeds 10 skaters because of a tie in points, all of the tied skaters are left out.
GP = Games played; G = Goals; A = Assists; Pts = Points; +/− = Plus/minus; PIM = Penalties in minutes; POS = PositionSource: IIHF.com

Leading goaltenders
Only the top five goaltenders, based on save percentage, who have played 40% of their team's minutes are included in this list.
TOI = Time On Ice (minutes:seconds); SA = Shots against; GA = Goals against; GAA = Goals against average; Sv% = Save percentage; SO = ShutoutsSource: IIHF.com

Group B tournament

Fixtures
All times local.

Ranking and statistics

GP = Games played; G = Goals; T = Ties; L = Losses; GF = Goals for; GA = Goals against; GDF = Goal difference; PTS = PointsSource: IIHF.com

Scoring leaders
List shows the top skaters sorted by points, then goals. If the list exceeds 10 skaters because of a tie in points, all of the tied skaters are left out.
GP = Games played; G = Goals; A = Assists; Pts = Points; +/− = Plus/minus; PIM = Penalties in minutes; POS = PositionSource: IIHF.com

Leading goaltenders
Only the top five goaltenders, based on save percentage, who have played 40% of their team's minutes are included in this list.
TOI = Time On Ice (minutes:seconds); SA = Shots against; GA = Goals against; GAA = Goals against average; Sv% = Save percentage; SO = ShutoutsSource: IIHF.com

References

IIHF World Championship Division I
2
World
World
International ice hockey competitions hosted by France
International ice hockey competitions hosted by Estonia
Sport in Amiens
2000s in Tallinn
Sports competitions in Tallinn